Smitty is a 2012 American family drama film directed by David Mickey Evans and starring Mira Sorvino, Peter Fonda and Louis Gossett Jr.

Plot
Amanda leaves her son Ben with her estranged father Jack, a grumpy Iowa farmer, after he gets in trouble too many times in Chicago. Jack successfully straightens the boy out with good food, farm chores, and a dog; the dog's former owners could not afford to keep him, and Ben names him after Mr. Smith, a wise storekeeper who befriends him.

Cast
Peter Fonda as Jack
Mira Sorvino as Amanda
 as Ben
Louis Gossett Jr. as Mr. Smith
Jason London as Russell
Gabrielle Bui as Tia
Booboo Stewart as Peebo
Lolita Davidovich as Judge Greenstein

Production
Filming occurred in Iowa.

Release
The film premiered at the WorldFest-Houston International Film/Video Festival in April 2012.

Reception
Tracey Moore of Common Sense Media awarded the film three stars out of five.  Nancy Adamson of the Midland Reporter-Telegram graded the film a C.

Duane Byrge of The Hollywood Reporter gave the film a positive review and wrote, “...but there is a great big Middle American audience out there for this heartfelt entertainment.“

References

External links
 
 
 

2012 films
American drama films
Films about dogs
Phase 4 Films films
Films set in 2010
2012 drama films
Films set in Iowa
Films shot in Iowa
2010s English-language films
2010s American films